Steenbergen is a municipality and a town in the province of North Brabant in the south of the Netherlands. The municipality is mainly agricultural including a strongly growing greenhouse sector, but Steenbergen and the nearby town of Dinteloord also contain some light industry. A new stretch of A4 motorway under construction is expected to further increase the municipality's attractiveness, allowing easy connections with the large cities of Rotterdam to the north and the Belgian city of Antwerp to the south. The connection with the nearby city of Bergen op Zoom will also be improved as a result.

Population centres

The city of Steenbergen 
Steenbergen received city rights in 1272.

Graves of Guy Gibson and Jim Warwick

Guy Gibson, Wing Commander and the first CO of the RAF's 617 Squadron which he led in the "Dam Busters" raid in 1943, crashed with his Mosquito aircraft in this municipality. Having returned to operational duties in 1944 after pestering Bomber Command, 26-year-old Gibson was killed along with his navigator, Sqn Ldr Jim Warwick, on a bombing raid on Rheydt (nowadays a borough of Mönchengladbach) operating as a Pathfinder Master Bomber based at RAF Coningsby, when his de Havilland Mosquito XX, KB267, crashed near Steenbergen on 19 September 1944. It was assumed for years that he had been shot down, but following the discovery of the wreckage it was found that a fault with the fuel tank selector possibly meant the aircraft simply ran out of fuel. An eye-witness account detailed how his aircraft circled Steenbergen and heard its engines 'splutter and stop'. In 2011 it was revealed the Mosquito may also have been shot down in a friendly fire incident. The graves are in the RC cemetery of Steenbergen. Streets have been named for both Gibson and Warwick, and one of the aircraft's propellers is located in the city park as a memorial.

Notable people 

 Johan Arnold Bloys van Treslong (1757 in Steenbergen – 1824) a Dutch naval officer and Patriot
 Jan Maas (1900 in Steenbergen – 1977) a Dutch racing cyclist who competed in the 1924 and the 1928 Summer Olympics 
 Niel Steenbergen (1911 in Steenbergen – 1997) a Dutch artist, sculptor, painter and medalist
 Ella Vogelaar (born 1949 in Steenbergen) a retired Dutch politician 
 Pierre van Hooijdonk (born 1969 in Steenbergen) a retired Dutch international footballer with 551 club caps
 Eric Hellemons (born 1971 in Kruisland) a Dutch former footballer with 358 club caps and current football coach, 
 Nasrdin Dchar (born 1978 in Steenbergen) a Moroccan-Dutch actor and presenter

Gallery

See also
Dinteloord en Prinsenland

References

External links

 
Municipalities of North Brabant
Populated places in North Brabant